The Sun Odyssey 34 is a French sailboat that was designed by Daniel Andrieu as a cruiser and first built in 1991.

The design is a development of the 1989 Andrieu-designed Sun Liberty 34 and related to the 1992 Sun Odyssey 33.

Production
The design was built by Jeanneau in France, from 1991 juntil 1993, but it is now out of production.

Design
The Sun Odyssey 34 is a recreational keelboat, built predominantly of fiberglass, with wood trim. It has a fractional sloop rig, a raked stem, a reverse transom, an internally mounted spade-type rudder and a fixed fin keel or optional shoal-draft keel. It displaces  and carries  of ballast.

The boat is fitted with a Japanese Yanmar diesel engine for docking and maneuvering.

The design has sleeping accommodation for six people, with a double "V"-berth in the bow cabin, a "U"-shaped settee and a straight settee in the main cabin and an aft cabin with a double berth on the starboard side. The galley is located on the port side just aft of the companionway ladder. The galley is "L"-shaped and is equipped with a two-burner stove, an ice box and a double sink. A navigation station is forward of the galley, on the port side. There are two heads, one just aft of the bow cabin on the starboard side and one on the starboard side just forward of the aft cabin.

See also
List of sailing boat types

References

External links

Keelboats
1990s sailboat type designs
Sailing yachts
Sailboat type designs by Daniel Andrieu
Sailboat types built by Jeanneau